Eugene Joseph Wolfgramm, a.k.a. Gene Hunt (born September 24, 1967), is a founding member of the Minneapolis-based group The Jets.  Like the other Wolfgramms, Eugene is a member of The Church of Jesus Christ of Latter-day Saints.

Biography
Eugene is one of seventeen siblings in the Wolfgramm family, eight of whom were originally in The Jets. Eugene was featured on the first two Jets albums (1985's The Jets, 1986's Christmas with The Jets, and was featured in the single and music video to 1987's  "Cross My Broken Heart" from the Beverly Hills Cop II soundtrack, but left the group in 1987 to form the duo Boys Club, with Joe Pasquale. Boys Club were arguably known as Minneapolis' version of Wham!. In 1990, Eugene reunited with his siblings to record four new tracks featured on The Best of The Jets (1990) and was featured on the album cover and inside sleeve. Eugene (under the alias Gene Hunt) also shared co-writing credit on The Jets' song "Do You Remember," featured on the album Believe (1989).

References

1967 births
Living people
American people of Tongan descent
American Latter Day Saints
20th-century American singers